Protoheterotrichida is an order of karyorelict ciliates. It contains the family Geleiidae.

References

External links 
 

Karyorelictea
Ciliate orders